The Kawasaki 440, also called the T/A 440, is a Japanese twin-cylinder, in-line, two-stroke engine that was designed for snowmobiles and produced by Kawasaki Heavy Industries until the early 1980s.

The engine was widely adapted for other purposes, including ultralight aircraft and Formula 500 automobile racing. Kawasaki did not condone or support the use of the engine in aircraft and it was largely supplanted in this role by the similar purpose-designed Rotax 377 aircraft engine.

Design and development
The engine has two cylinders in an in-line configuration. The single ignition system uses a coil and points. Fuel is metered by a Mikuni 34 mm slide-type carburetor. Starting is by a recoil starter system with electric start as an option.

In its aircraft applications the 440 uses an aftermarket reduction drive system to reduce the maximum 5000 rpm to a speed more manageable for propeller use.

Applications
Aircraft

Automotive
Formula 500

Specifications (440)

See also

References

Air-cooled aircraft piston engines
Two-stroke aircraft piston engines